V. Unbeatable (also known as Vikas Unbeatable) is a Mumbai-based dance crew. They rose to fame in India when they took part in the dance series Dance Plus for season 4 in 2018 and finished in the top 4. They received international coverage when they took part in season 14 of America's Got Talent and received a Golden Buzzer from basketball player and guest judge Dwyane Wade. 

In February 2020, they won season 2 of America's Got Talent: The Champions.

The dancers come from the slums of Mumbai. There they lived under bad conditions with no electricity, barely any clean drinking water, with six or seven people living in one room. They were very poor, and in principle, they danced secretly.

Background 
The V in the name stands for Vikas, after a former crew member, Vikas Gupta, who died performing stunts during a rehearsal. In 2018, they competed on the Indian dance competition Dance Plus and finished in 4th place. Prior to this they had taken part in a reality show called India Banega Manch.

America's Got Talent 
On America's Got Talent in 2019, V. Unbeatable's Judge Cuts performance consisted of an acrobatic dance routine in tribute to their fallen founder, which included flipping members over the judges' table and into chairs held high above them. Howie Mandel, Gabrielle Union, Julianne Hough, Simon Cowell, and guest judge Dwyane Wade all gave them standing ovations. Impressed with their performance, Wade hit the Golden Buzzer, sending V. Unbeatable directly to the quarterfinals. They made it past the semifinals and performed in the finals. In the end, they took 4th place in the 2019 AGT.

America's Got Talent: The Champions 
V. Unbeatable returned to America's Got Talent: The Champions in 2020 (the second season of the show) after coming 4th in America's Got Talent. After their first performance, they received a golden buzzer from judge Howie Mandel, sending the dance group straight to the finals along with three other contestants. After a stunning performance in the finals and a performance with Travis Barker in the results episode they proceeded to make the Top 5. After announcing the 5th, 4th and 3rd place acts they announced the winner. In the end they won the competition receiving the title of "World Champion", a cash prize and the grand champions trophy.

Television

References 

America's Got Talent contestants
Indian dance groups